Hexophthalma hahni (synonyms Sicarius hahni and Sicarius testaceus), known along with other members of the genus as the six-eyed sand spider, is a member of the family Sicariidae, found in deserts and other sandy places in southern Africa.  Due to their flattened stance and laterigrade legs, they are also sometimes known as six-eyed crab spiders. Its specific name honours Carl Wilhelm Hahn.

Venom
All species of Hexophthalma produce venom that can have necrotic (dermonecrotic) effects, capable of causing serious or even life-threatening wounds, particularly if the wound becomes infected or the venom spreads in the body. The necrotic effects are caused by a family of proteins related to sphingomyelinase D, present in the venom of all sicariid spiders. Most Hexophthalma species, though, including H. hahnii, have only been studied in vitro, and the detailed effects of their venom in humans and other vertebrates are unknown.  No records of bites in southern Africa have been proven.

References

External links 
 Ellis R P Survival strategy: hiding (of six-eyed sand spider)

Sicariidae
Spiders of Africa
Spiders described in 1878